The 2006–07 season was Norwich City's second consecutive year in the Football League Championship after failing to gain promotion back to the Premier League at the first attempt. This article shows statistics and lists all matches that Norwich City played in the season.

Season overview

End of the Worthington era

Following the departure of key players Robert Green and Leon McKenzie to West Ham United and Coventry City respectively, Norwich's lack of activity in the summer transfer window was somewhat surprising. Indeed, only one player - Lee Croft, from Manchester City, for a fee in the region of £600,000 - came into the club on a permanent basis. However, despite this and an opening day defeat, the club enjoyed a relatively good start to the season, with three consecutive home wins in the league and progress in the League Cup. This form did not last - having collected just one point from a possible twelve during September, pressure was mounting on manager Nigel Worthington. Following the 3–1 defeat at Plymouth Argyle on 23 September, joint majority shareholders Delia Smith and Michael Wynn-Jones issued a public ultimatum stating that performances must immediately improve.

In their next match on 1 October, Norwich slumped to a 4–1 defeat against Burnley at Carrow Road - a game which was televised by Sky Sports. The club announced they had parted company with Worthington just hours after the final whistle.

Grant appointed

Martin Hunter was appointed caretaker manager going into the October international break. His side came out 3–0 winners in a friendly match at King's Lynn, specially arranged for former Norwich midfielder Shaun Carey who had suffered a double fracture of his leg. During the week leading up to the meeting with Queens Park Rangers on 14 October, it emerged that former City player and West Ham coach Peter Grant was to be appointed new manager of the Canaries. He watched from the stands as his new side - still under the guidance of Hunter - drew 3–3 with QPR, conceding a stoppage-time equaliser by Martin Rowlands.

Grant's start was encouraging, winning four of his first six matches in full charge. This included beating all three sides relegated from the Premier League the previous season, as well as then league leaders, Cardiff City. However, defeat to local rivals Ipswich Town followed by a run of six defeats in nine through December and January left the club languishing in 17th, with no realistic hopes of reaching the play-offs and just four points above the relegation zone.

A key point in the season came on 27 February, in a match against Luton Town at Kenilworth Road. Norwich were behind twice in the game and defeat would have left them in real relegation danger. However, equalisers from emerging striker Chris Martin and defender Jason Shackell, followed by a vital stoppage-time winning free-kick from new signing Simon Lappin lifted City to the relative safety of 16th.

Norwich's form in the latter part of the season was very inconsistent, often winning one then losing one. The main bright spot was arguably the emergence of young striker Martin, who scored in four consecutive league games through February and March, reportedly attracting interest from Manchester United. The return of top scorer Robert Earnshaw from injury could not stop a run of three defeats from the last four games, which left City ending an overall disappointing campaign in 16th place and hoping for much better in 2007–08.

Matches

League

August

September

October

November

December

January

February

March

April

May

FA Cup

League Cup

Transfers

Summer

In

Out

Winter

In

Out

Players

First team squad
Squad at end of season.

|-

Left club during season

Board and staff members

Board members

Coaching staff

League table

Notes

References

Norwich City F.C. seasons
Norwich City